Una Mujer Como Yo is an album by the Cuban musician Albita, released in 1997.

The album peaked at No. 9 on Billboard'''s Tropical Albums chart. It was nominated for a Grammy Award, in the "Best Tropical Latin Album" category.

Production
The album was produced by Emilio Estefan, Jr. It was recorded more quickly than Albita's previous two albums, and moved beyond traditional Cuban music styles. Albita wrote "Tocame con un Beso" and "Y No Tengo Guano"; Kike Santander contributed to the writing and arranging of some of Una Mujer Como Yo's songs.

Critical receptionMiami New Times deemed the album "a shrill pastiche of merengue, salsa, cumbia, vallenato, Cuban jazz riffs and even, God help us, rap." The Orlando Sentinel wrote that "the up-tempo songs celebrate Albita's musical roots and influences but don't sound like a formal excursion into the past." The San Diego Union-Tribune declared that "Albita, with her deep, rich voice, could sing any style and make it sound easy."Newsday called the songs "full pedal-to-the-metal jams," writing that "never has Albita sounded so agreeably aggressive on disc." The Commercial Appeal stated that "the Cuban with the beefy alto fuses folk instruments to modern production without sacrificing one syncopated, seductive note." The Baltimore Sun'' determined that Albita's voice "is dark and lustrous, with all the sweet sonority of a trombone, and she uses that to great effect against the brass and percussion of 'Me Demito' or the breathlessly rhythmic 'Ven a Verme'"; the paper later listed the album as the tenth best of 1997.

Track listing

References

1997 albums
Epic Records albums
Albums produced by Emilio Estefan